Cristina Altagracia Lizardo Mézquita (born 20 January 1959) is a politician and academic from the Dominican Republic. She is Senator for the province of Santo Domingo. Lizardo is the very first woman that presides both the Senate and the Congress of the Dominican Republic. She has a degree in education from the Autonomous University of Santo Domingo.

In her 2010 sworn statement of assets, she indicated that her net worth was RD$ 11.8 million.

In 2007, she was diagnosed with breast cancer. She had a successful mastectomy and survived the disease.

References

External links 

 www.cristinalizardo.com.do/
 Presidency of the Senate of the Dominican Republic

|-

Living people
1959 births
People from San Juan Province (Dominican Republic)
Universidad Autónoma de Santo Domingo alumni
Dominican Republic women academics
21st-century Dominican Republic women politicians
21st-century Dominican Republic politicians
Dominican Liberation Party politicians
Presidents of the Senate of the Dominican Republic